Morteza Aghakhan Mahhalati (born 5 April 1993); is an Iranian professional footballer who plays for Persian Gulf Pro League club Aluminium Arak.

Club career

Mes Rafsanjan
He was chosen by Bahman Foroutan for Mes Rafsanjan's first team while he was 19 and he made 4 appearances in 2012–13 Division 1.

Paykan
Aghakhan joined Paykan in summer 2013. He made his debut for Paykan on November 10, 2013 against Iranjavan as a starter. He scored his first goal for Paykan in his second appearance for them against Badr Bandar Kong.

Esteghlal
On 31 May 2018, Aghakhan officially signed for Esteghlal.

International career
He was called up by Nelo Vingada to the Iran U-23 training camp to prepare for the 2014 Asian Games and 2016 AFC U-23 Championship.

Career statistics

Honours
Paykan
Azadegan League: 2015–16

References

External links
 Morteza Aghakhan at PersianLeague.com
 Morteza Aghakhan at IranLeague.ir

1993 births
Living people
Iranian footballers
Mes Rafsanjan players
Paykan F.C. players
Esteghlal F.C. players
Saipa F.C. players
Aluminium Arak players
People from Tehran Province
Association football wingers
Association football forwards
Iran youth international footballers